Bon-gwan (or Bongwan) is the concept of clan in Korea, which is used to distinguish clans that happen to share the same family name (clan name). The bon-gwan system identifies descent groups by geographic place of origin.

A Korean clan is a group of people that share the same paternal ancestor and is indicated by the combination of a bon-gwan and a family name (clan name). However, a bon-gwan is not treated as a part of a Korean person's name. The bon-gwan and the family name are passed on from a father to his children, thus ensuring that person in the same paternal lineage sharing the same combination of the bon-gwan and the family name. A bon-gwan does not change by marriage or adoption.

Bon-gwan are used to distinguish different lineages that bear the same family name.  For example, the Gyeongju Kim and the Gimhae Kim are considered different clans, even though they happen to share the same family name Kim. In this case, Gyeongju and Gimhae are the respective bon-gwan of these clans.

Different family names sharing the same bon-gwan sometimes trace their origin to a common paternal ancestor, e.g. the  clan and the  clan share Suro of Geumgwan Gaya as their common paternal ancestor, though such cases are exceptional.

According to the population and housing census of 2000 conducted by the South Korean government, there are a total of 286 surnames and 4,179 clans.

Restrictions on marriage and adoption
Traditionally, a man and a woman in the same clan could not marry, so the combination of the bon-gwan and the family name of a husband had to differ from that of a wife. Until 1997, this was also the law, but this was ruled as unconstitutional and now DNA tests have superseded bon-gwan as an indication of one's lineage.

When adopting a child, the adoptive father and the adopted child must share the same combination of the bon-gwan and the family name. However, in exceptional circumstances, adoptive parents can change an adopted child’s family name for the adopted child's welfare. In this case, the adoptive parents must visit a family court to request permission to change the family name.

List

See also 
 Ancestral home (Chinese)
 Korean clan names of foreign origin
 Korean name
 List of common Korean surnames
 Place of origin

References

External links
List of Korean clans (in Korean)

Korean clans
Clans